The Department of Culture and Tourism was established in February 2012 by Sheikh Khalifa bin Zayed Al Nahyan, President of the United Arab Emirates, to replace Abu Dhabi's two main tourism and culture agencies, the Abu Dhabi Tourism Authority and the Abu Dhabi Authority for Culture and Heritage.

About
The new authority's objective is to preserve and manage the art and cultural heritage of the emirate and develop tourism and future museum projects such as Zayed National Museum, Guggenheim Abu Dhabi and Louvre Abu Dhabi Museums.

In September 2017, Sheikh Khalifa issued a decree to reshape the Executive Council of Abu Dhabi, which included renaming the Abu Dhabi Tourism and Culture Authority to Department of Culture and Tourism.

Merger 
The authority is a merge between three, Abu Dhabi Authority for Culture and Heritage; an institution which was responsible of preservation of cultural heritage, Abu Dhabi Tourism Authority and cultural department of Tourism Development & Investment Company (TDIC); one of the private developers in culture tourism in the emirate.

The merge was ordered by executive council and Sultan bin Tahnoon Al Nahyan was appointed as chairman to oversees the emergence of the new authority leveraging his experience as chairman of former TDIC’s Cultural Department.

See also 

 Abu Dhabi Art
 Cultural policy in Abu Dhabi
 List of tourist attractions in the United Arab Emirates

References

External links 
 

Arab art scene
2012 establishments in the United Arab Emirates
Ministries established in 2012
Abu Dhabi
Abu Dhabi